Phostria vitrifera is a moth in the family Crambidae. It is found in French Guiana and Costa Rica.

References

Moths described in 1911
Phostria
Moths of Central America
Moths of South America